General elections were held in Barbados on 19 January 2022 to elect the 30 members of the House of Assembly. The ruling Barbados Labour Party won all 30 seats for the second consecutive election.

This was the 12th national election held since independence from the United Kingdom in 1966, the 16th since the institution of universal suffrage in 1950, and the first since Barbados became a republic in 2021.  For the first time, both the ruling Barbados Labour Party and its historical rival the Democratic Labour Party were led by women.

Background
According to the Constitution of Barbados, the Parliament shall stand dissolved no later than every five years from the first sitting of Parliament. The previous general elections were held on 24 May 2018, and the first sitting of the new session of Parliament was held on 5 June 2018. After the dissolution of Parliament, the President of Barbados must issue a writ for a general election of members to the House of Assembly and for appointment of Senators to the Senate within 90 days.

Despite a commanding 29–1 BLP majority in the House of Assembly and elections not being required until 2023, on 27 December 2021 Prime Minister Mia Mottley announced that an early election would be held on 19 January the following year. Mottley's announcement came within a month of the country becoming a republic. She described the election as a "refuelling stop" for the nation, while opposition leaders criticised the early elections as an attempt by her to consolidate power.

On 30 December 2021 Joseph Atherley, who served as the official Leader of the Opposition of the House of Assembly and leader of the People's Party for Democracy and Development, announced an alliance with the United Progressive Party for the election under the name Alliance Party for Progress (APP).

Early voting was held for police officers and election day workers on 12 January.

On 18 January, Philip Catlyn, a member of the Barbados Sovereignty Party (BSP), filed for an injunction against the President and the Attorney General to stop the election.  He argued that the home isolation requirements for those testing positive for COVID-19 would prevent close to 5,000 people from voting.  Barbados does not allow absentee voting.   After hearing the legal arguments. High Court justice Cicely Chase dismissed the case as being out of her jurisdiction.  She said that the case should have been filed in an election court.

Electoral system
The 30 members of the House of Assembly are elected by first-past-the-post voting in single-member constituencies.

Candidates
Seven political parties nominated candidates for this election.  Including 10 independents, there were a total of 109 candidates.

Parties

Independents

Results

Results by constituency 
Source for votes:

Christ Church East

Christ Church East Central

Christ Church South

Christ Church West

Christ Church West Central

City of Bridgetown

St. Peter

St. Joseph

St. Lucy

St. Philip North

St. Philip South

St. Philip West

St. Andrew

St. George North

St. George South

St. James Central

St. James North

St. James South

St. John

St. Michael Central

St. Michael East

St. Michael North

St. Michael North East

St. Michael North West

St. Michael South

St. Michael South Central

St. Michael South East

St. Michael West

St. Michael West Central

St. Thomas

Aftermath

Prime Minister Mottley and attorney-general Dale Marshall were both sworn in for a second term by president Sandra Mason on 20 January 2022.

On 21 January, as the DLP had not regained any seats in the House of Assembly, DLP president Verla De Peiza resigned. Ronnie Yearwood was then subsequently elected leader of the party on 1 May 2022.  APP leader Joseph Atherley announced that the alliance would begin preparing for the next election.  Both APP and DLP drew attention to the low voter turnout rate.

The Solutions Barbados party congratulated the BLP and announced its willingness to work with the government.  Prime Minister Mottley received congratulations from foreign countries and organisations such as Caricom and the OECS.

The newly re-elected Prime Minister of Barbados, Mia Mottley, announced the following Cabinet of Ministers on 24 January 2022, and subsequently added William Duguid the next day:

Source: St.Lucia Times

Source:  St.Lucia Times

See also
List of parliamentary constituencies of Barbados

References

Barbados
General election
Election and referendum articles with incomplete results
Elections in Barbados
Barbados
Landslide victories